Psycho Village is an Austrian rock band.

History

Beginnings and It's Okay 
Psycho Village was founded in 2009 by singer and guitarist Daniel Kremsner at age 15. In 2012, the band started a collaboration with producer Gwenael Damman (known for working with Avril Lavigne, etc.). In the same year the band toured Austria and began the production of their first single "It's Okay."
On 15 March 2013, "It's Okay" was released in Austria. On 5 April 2013, the song debuted on the official Austrian charts – Ö3 Austria Top 40 – at No. 62 and reached No. 32 on the charts. "It's Okay" also reached No. 8 on the iTunes Charts. The single was mixed by Richard Furch (Christina Aguilera, Usher, Prince etc.) and mastered by Will Quinnell (Rihanna, Nelly Furtado, Jonas Brothers etc.).

Selfmade Fairytale – Part 1 
The EP Selfmade Fairytale – Part 1 was released on 30 May 2014, 
and earned positive critical reviews. The music magazine Enemy called Selfmade Fairytale – Part 1 one of the best debuts by an Austrian band and rated it 4 / 5 Stars, as did Stormbringer magazine.

The German magazine Rock Hard said, "On their dabut, the boys sound so professional and finished, that even though the temperature is rising Alter Bridge, Shinedown & Co. can wrap themselves up warm. Seven songs, seven earcatchers, seven times dynamite!" 
 
The single "Perfect" entered the Austrian rock-charts at No. 1 and the iTunes- and Downloadcharts in Austria on at No. 3.
 "Perfect" reached No. 30 on the Austria Top 40 and No. 220 on the Euro 200 charts.

During the Selfmade Fairytale Tour in 2014, Psycho Village performed sold out shows all over Austria and performed at the Sziget Festival in Hungary, and at the Donauinselfest in Vienna.

Social engagement 
On 16 March 2013, Band announced all the income from "March" would be donated to Save the Children. The band donated all the income from the sold out concert at the Viper Room in Vienna on 28 June 2013, to charities to support the victims of the big flood in Austria. In September 2013, the band played a benefit to support the Waluka Projekt, raising money for schools in Kenya. On the following day Psycho Village played at the 9er Haus in Hennersdorf, Lower Austria, to support the Rote Nasen charity, which received all the profits.

Discography

Singles

EPs

Album

Music videos

Tours

Awards

References

External links 
 psychovillage.com – Webseite der Band

Post-grunge groups
Austrian alternative rock groups